Numerous plants have been introduced to Arizona, and many of them have become invasive species. The following are some of these species:

See also
Invasive species in the United States

External links
Non-native, Invasive Plants of Arizona. Howrey, L. D., Ed. University of Arizona Cooperative Extension.
USDA PLANTS Database USDA database showing county distribution of plant species in the US
InvasiveSpecies.gov Information from the US National Invasive Species Council

invasive plants
Arizona
Environment of Arizona
Flora of Arizona
Natural history of Arizona